Gideon's Trumpet is a 1964 book by Anthony Lewis describing the story behind the 1963 landmark court case Gideon v. Wainwright, in which the Supreme Court of the United States ruled that criminal defendants have the right to an attorney even if they cannot afford one. In 1965, the book won an Edgar Award from the Mystery Writers of America for Best Fact Crime book.

A made-for-TV movie, of the same name, based on the book was released in 1980, starring Henry Fonda as Clarence Earl Gideon, José Ferrer as Abe Fortas and John Houseman as Earl Warren (though Warren's name was never mentioned in the film; he was billed simply as "The Chief Justice"). Houseman also provided the offscreen closing narration at the end of the film.  Lewis himself appeared in a small role as "The Reporter". The movie was a Hallmark Hall of Fame presentation produced by Worldvision, and aired on CBS.

The name is a play on words, using the defendant's last name and invoking the biblical story in which Gideon ordered his small force to attack a much larger enemy camp. Gideon's army carried trumpets and concealed torches in clay pots. When the call to attack came, the noise and light they made tricked their enemies into thinking that a much larger army was attacking them. Thus, Gideon won the battle with little actual fighting (Judges 7:16-22).

See also 
 Clarence Earl Gideon
 Gideon v. Wainwright

References
 Anthony Lewis, Gideon's Trumpet. New York: Vintage Books/Random House, 1964. (most of the book's material previously published in the New Yorker in 1964 in a different form)
 Library of Congress Catalog Card Number 64:11986.

1964 non-fiction books
American non-fiction books
Law books
1980 television films
1980 films
1980 drama films
American courtroom films
Courtroom dramas
American docudrama films
Edgar Award-winning works
Hallmark Hall of Fame episodes
Peabody Award-winning broadcasts
1980s prison films
1980s legal films
Random House books
Hebrew Bible words and phrases
American drama television films
1980s American films